The Harp and Bowl style of worship, which features musical prayer, derives its name from Revelation 5:8, which describes heavenly creatures which each "had a harp" and "were holding golden bowls full of incense, which are the prayers of the saints."

References

Church music
Charismatic and Pentecostal Christianity